Imran Khan is a Pakistani politician and the former Prime Minister of Pakistan. Before joining politics, Khan was a cricket player. He was the captain of the Pakistan national cricket team which won the 1992 Cricket World Cup. After retirement, Khan started philanthropy work. In 1996, Khan founded the Pakistan Tehreek-e-Insaf (PTI) party.

In 1983, he was recognized by Wisden Cricketers' Almanack as the Wisden Cricketer of the Year. In 2010, he was inducted into International Cricket Council's Hall of Fame. During his cricketing career, he received numerous Player of the Match awards. He received the award on eleven occasions out of which he received five against Windies cricket team.

Khan has also been known in philanthropy and is founder of two cancer hospitals and a science, technology, engineering, and mathematics (STEM) subjects college. He has also received honorary fellowship of Royal College of Physicians of Edinburgh for his services regarding treatment of cancer patients in Pakistan. He was also inducted in Oxford University Hall of Fame.

National awards
Imran Khan was captain of the Pakistan national cricket team on three occasions: 1982 – 1983; 1985 – 1987; and 1989 – 1992. In 1992, under his captaincy Pakistan team won the Cricket World Cup. This is the only time the Pakistan team has won this competition. For this achievement, Khan received the Hilal-e-Imtiaz, the second highest civilian award and honour bestowed by the Government of Pakistan. In 1983, he received the president's Pride of Performance award.

International awards
In December 2019, Khan was awarded Bahrain's highest civil award, the King Hamad Order of the Renaissance by King Hamad bin Isa Al-Khalifa at the Sakhir Palace.

Sporting awards

International
Imran Khan was described by the BBC as, "One of the finest fast bowlers cricket has ever seen." ESPNcricinfo described him as, "The greatest cricketer to emerge from Pakistan, and arguably the world's second-best all-rounder after Garry Sobers."
 The Cricket Society Wetherall Award, leading all-rounder in English first-class cricket. (1976 and 1980).
 Wisden Cricketer of the Year (1983).
 Sussex Cricket Society Player of the Year. (1985)
 Indian Cricket Cricketer of the Year. (1990)
 International Cricket Council Hall of Fame, Centennial Year celebrations. (9 July 2004).
 Inaugural Silver Jubilee award, Asian Cricket Council, Karachi. (5 July 2008)
 International Cricket Council Hall of Fame (2010)

One Day International Cricket

Man of the Match awards

Philanthropy and politics

Office
 Pakistan Tehreek-e-Insaf party, founder and chairman.
 Shaukat Khanum Memorial Cancer Hospital & Research Centre, founder and chairman of board of governors.
 Namal College, president.
 UNICEF, special representative for sports, (Promotion of health and immunisation programmes in Bangladesh, Pakistan, Sri Lanka, and Thailand).

Honours
 Oxford University Hall of Fame.
 Keble College, Oxford, honorary fellow.
 Lifetime achievement award, Asian jewel awards, London, 8 July 2004. ("Acting as a figurehead for many international charities, and working passionately and extensively in fund-raising activities.")
 Humanitarian award, Asian sports awards, Kuala Lumpur, 13 December 2007. (Founding the first cancer hospital in Pakistan.)
 Jinnah award, 2011.
 Royal College of Physicians of Edinburgh, honorary fellowship, 28 July 2012. (Services for cancer treatment in Pakistan through the Shaukat Khanum Memorial Cancer Hospital and Research Centre).
In 2019, he was named one of Time magazine's 100 Most Influential People in the World.
 The 500 Most Influential Muslims recognised Khan as the world's 16th most influential Muslim in their 2020 version. in the 2022 version he is in the top ten, at number 10.

References

Imran Khan
Khan
Pakistan-related lists